

222001–222100 

|-id=032
|  222032 Lupton ||  || Robert H. Lupton (born 1958), a British-American astrophysicist, a Sloan Digital Sky Survey telescope builder and a principal author of the SDSS Moving Object Catalogue. || 
|}

222101–222200 

|-bgcolor=#f2f2f2
| colspan=4 align=center | 
|}

222201–222300 

|-bgcolor=#f2f2f2
| colspan=4 align=center | 
|}

222301–222400 

|-bgcolor=#f2f2f2
| colspan=4 align=center | 
|}

222401–222500 

|-id=403
|  222403 Bethchristie ||  || Beth Christie (born 1961) has a lifelong interest in astronomy. She is a member of the Spectrashift Project at Raemor Observatory in Sierra Vista, Arizona, which is conducting a search for exoplanets. || 
|}

222501–222600 

|-bgcolor=#f2f2f2
| colspan=4 align=center | 
|}

222601–222700 

|-bgcolor=#f2f2f2
| colspan=4 align=center | 
|}

222701–222800 

|-bgcolor=#f2f2f2
| colspan=4 align=center | 
|}

222801–222900 

|-bgcolor=#f2f2f2
| colspan=4 align=center | 
|}

222901–223000 

|-bgcolor=#f2f2f2
| colspan=4 align=center | 
|}

References 

222001-223000